Julurpad or Julurpadu is a mandal in Bhadradri Kothagudem district, Telangana, India.

Demographics
According to Indian census, 2001, the demographic details of Julurpad mandal is as follows:
 Total Population: 	31,739	in 7,448 Households. 	
 Male Population: 	16,020	and Female Population: 	15,719		
 Children Under 6-years of age: 5,030	(Boys - 2,545 and Girls -	2,485)
 Total Literates: 	12,311

References
	

Mandals in Bhadradri Kothagudem district